"Sweet 19 Blues" (stylized as "SWEET 19 BLUES") is a song recorded by Japanese recording artist Namie Amuro. The song was composed, written and arranged by Tetsuya Komuro for her same titled debut album. A month after its release, her label Avex Trax released the song as a recut single due to popular demand. The song's subject and the album was about the melancholic passing of another sweet year of youth, which is a particularly Japanese obsession.

It did not achieve the success of her previous records but debut at No. 2 with over 100,000 copies sold in its first week and sold about 500,000 units, a great feat for a post-album single. The single was certified platinum by the RIAJ for 400,000 copies shipped to stores.

The song was later served as the ending theme song for the 1996 comedy That's Cunning! Shijō Saidai no Sakusen?, in which she also starred. Marked the first and only time she used a track to promote theatrically. 
Miliyah Kato's "19 Memories" later sampled the song.

The new version of the song marked 18 years since its original release in 2014.

Composition
The song carries its album's title, which according to Ted Mills from AllMusic, was a reflection of a "melancholic passing of another sweet year of youth" and a "particular Japanese obsession".

Release
The song "Joy", which features vocals by M.C.A.T., is in fact a shortened version to what appears on the CD single of "Sweet 19 Blues"; two additional remixes appeared on it, whilst an original mix was featured on his single "Thunder Party". "Joy" was originally on m.c.A.T's fifth studio album Crossover.

Music video
The new version of the video was directed by Kanji Suto.

Track listing

Credits and personnel
Credits are taken from the CD singles liner notes.
 Tetsuya Komuro – production, composition, writing, arrangement (1), (2)
 Randy Waldman - strings arrangement (1), (2)
 Akio Togashi - composition, arrangement; writing, rapping (as m.c.A.T) (3), (4)
 Keith "KC" Cohen - mixing (3), (4)

TV Performances
?, 1996 – Fun
August 23, 1996 – Music Station
August 24, 1996 – Mega Hit Night
August 31, 1996 – PopJam
August 31, 1996 – CDTV
September 16, 1996 – Hey! Hey! Hey! Music Champ Special
October 4, 1996 – Music Station Special
October 29, 1996 – Utaban
October 4, 1996 – Music Station Special
November 2, 1996 – 27 hours TV
November 26, 1996 – P-Stock
December 14, 1996 – 29th All Japan Request Awards
May 21, 1997 – TK Groove Museum HongKong
May 27, 1997 – TK Pan-Pacific Tour

Charts
Oricon Sales Chart (Japan)

References 

1996 singles
Namie Amuro songs
Song recordings produced by Tetsuya Komuro
Songs written by Tetsuya Komuro
1996 songs
Avex Trax singles
Japanese film songs